The 1993 World Marathon Cup was the fifth edition of the World Marathon Cup of athletics and were held in San Sebastián, Spain.

Results

Individual men

Individual women

References

Results
IAAF World Cup. Association of Road Racing Statisticians. Retrieved 2018-03-30.

World Marathon Cup
World Cup
World Marathon Cup
Marathons in Spain
International athletics competitions hosted by Spain